The London Scene is a documentary film about urban flora and fauna in London, which first aired on ITV in 1961. It was the first programme in the Survival series.

External links 
The London Scene  WildFilmHistory page

Documentary films about urban animals
1961 films
1961 documentary films
Documentary films about London
1961 in British television
1961 in London
ITV (TV network) original programming
British television films
1960s English-language films